European Venezuelans or White Venezuelans are Venezuelan citizens who self-identify in the national census as white, tracing their heritage to European ethnic groups or Venezuelan citizens who has a European Surname which is not a Spanish or Portuguese surname. According to the official census report, although "white" literally involves external issues such as light skin, shape and color of hair and eyes, among others, the term "white" has been used in different ways in different historical periods and places, and so its precise definition is somewhat confusing.

According to the 2011 National Population and Housing Census, 43.6% of the population identified themselves as white people. A genomic study shows that about 61.5% of the Venezuelan gene pool has European origin. Among the Latin American and Caribbean countries in the study (Argentina, Bahamas, Brazil, Chile, Costa Rica, Colombia, El Salvador, Ecuador, Jamaica, Mexico, Peru, Puerto Rico, and Venezuela), Brazil, Venezuela, and Argentina exhibit the highest European contribution.

The ancestry of European Venezuelans is primarily Spanish, Portuguese, and Italian.

Other ancestries of European Venezuelans are: Germans, Poles, Greeks, Serbs and another minorities.

History 

Spaniards settled Venezuela during the colonial period. Most of them were from Andalusia, Galicia, Basque Country and from the Canary Islands. Until the last years of World War II, a large part of the European immigrants to Venezuela came from the Canary Islands, and its cultural impact was significant, influencing the development of the Spanish language in the country, the Venezuelan gastronomy and customs.

During the 19th century the bulk of the white Dominicans migrated to Venezuela due to the political and economic instability in their country, especially after the French and Haitian annexation, but also because of constant coups and civil wars; they went from being half to barely a fifth of the Dominican population.

In the late 1940s, 1950s and early 1960s came nearly two million immigrants from Europe, mostly Spanish, Portuguese, Italians, and Jews from eastern Europe.

Census 
Definition of white according to the census of Venezuela
"According to the Venezuela census the definition of White is: People whose skin tone is clear and that is why it is usually associated with populations of European origin. Although it literally implies external issues such as clear skin, shape and color of hair and eyes, among others, "white" has been used in different ways in different historical periods and places. Like other common words for human ethnicities, its precise definition is somewhat confusing"
With this definition, the true percentage of white population in Venezuela is not clear.

Geographic distribution

White Venezuelan population by Venezuelan state 
The following is a sortable table of the white Venezuelan proportion of the population in each Venezuelan state, according to the 2011 Census data.

Percentage of white Venezuelans in municipalities 

The top 20 communities (municipalities) with the highest percentage of White Venezuelans according to the 2011 Census:
 Chacao (Metropolitan District of Caracas) 72.20%
 Umuquena (San Judas Tadeo), Táchira 71.80%
 Cordero (Andrés Bello), Táchira 70.11%
 Lechería (Diego Bautista), Anzoátegui 70.10%
 El Hatillo (Metropolitan District of Caracas) 68.80%
 San Antonio de Los Altos (Los Salias), Miranda 66.90%
 Baruta (Metropolitan District of Caracas) 66.40%
 Canaguá (Arzobispo Chacón), Mérida and Lobatera (Lobatera), Táchira 65.50%
 La Grita (Jáuregui), Táchira 64.70%
 San Cristóbal, Táchira 64.50%
 El Junko (Metropolitan District of Caracas) 63.20%
 Táriba, Táchira 62.80%
 Michelena, Táchira 62.50
 Palmira (Guásimos), Táchira 62.30%
 Seboruco (Seboruco), Táchira 61.90%
 Pueblo Llano, Mérida 61.30
 Tovar, Mérida 60.90%
 Colonia Tovar (Tovar), Aragua 60.80%
 Capacho Nuevo (Independencia), Táchira 60.20%
 El Cobre (José María Vargas), Táchira 60.00%

Density of white Venezuelans in municipalities 
The top 20 communities (municipalities) by population density (per km2) of white Venezuelans, according to the 2011 Census:
 Chacao (Metropolitan District of Caracas) 3,962.69
 Santa Rita (Francisco Linares Alcántara), Aragua 2,604.25
 Carlos Soublette, Vargas 2,506.08
 Capital District (Metropolitan District of Caracas) 2,493.38
 Baruta (Metropolitan District of Caracas) 2,479.77
 Sucre (Metropolitan District of Caracas) 1,967.07
 Maracaibo, Zulia 1,835.49
 Lechería (Diego Bautista), Anzoátegui 1,668.23
 Porlamar (Mariño), Nueva Esparta 1,176.69
 San Francisco, Zulia 1,110.25
 Los Guayos, Carabobo 1,107.78
 Catia La Mar, Vargas 1,094.47
 San Antonio de Los Altos (Los Salias), Miranda 1065.68
 Carrizal, Miranda 970.25
 El Limón (Mario Briceño Iragorry), Aragua 944.04
 Palmira (Guásimos), Táchira 932.00
 Santa Cruz (José Angel Lamas), Aragua 800.90
 San Cristóbal, Táchira 766.64
 Cagua (Sucre), Aragua 761.63
 Pampatar (Maneiro), Nueva Esparta 749.08

See also

Demographics of Venezuela
Spanish immigration to Venezuela
Portuguese Venezuelan
Arab Venezuelans
Mestizos in Venezuela
White Latin Americans
White Colombians
Afro-Venezuelans
Romanian Venezuelan
Hungarian Venezuelan
Greeks in Venezuela
Italian Venezuelans
White people
Venezuelans
Basque Venezuelans
Croatian Venezuelans
Serbian Venezuelans
Polish Venezuelans
Slovene Venezuelans
Russian Venezuelans
Ukrainian Venezuelans
History of the Jews in Venezuela

References 

Venezuelan people of European descent
 
Venezuelan